"Beach Baby" is a song by the British band The First Class. Written by John Carter and his wife, Gillian (Jill) Shakespeare, the song became the band's only substantial hit. The subject of the lyrics is not holiday love, but a broken love relationship between two high school students in Los Angeles in the 1950s.

Background
Carter and Shakespeare wrote "Beach Baby" in their home in East Sheen, South West London.  Shortly afterward, Carter hired lead singer Tony Burrows and session singer Chas Mills to record it under the band name The First Class.  Burrows attempts to sing the tune in an American accent, reflecting the song's California setting.

Towards the end of the song are two instrumental quotations, both on the French horn:  the main theme from the last movement of Sibelius's Fifth Symphony, and the tune of the title line from one of Carter's previous compositions, "Let's Go to San Francisco", a 1967 hit for The Flower Pot Men. The estate of Jean Sibelius filed a lawsuit against the song's writers, for infringing on the copyright of the Sibelius piece. The case was settled out of court, with the Sibelius estate receiving half of the song's proceeds.  

Because the running time was over five minutes, several AM radio stations edited "Beach Baby" by fading it out during the second instrumental bridge. The fade outs took on some importance, helping to avoid further legal implications.

In the 31 August 1974 edition of American Top 40, Casey Kasem claimed:

 
The 21 September 1974 edition of the program added the detail that the song was recorded in London on 24 December 1973.

An engineer who was involved in the recording session recalls: "The recording was made in February 1974 at Lansdowne Studios, Holland Park, London. Tony Burrows was singing, John Carter producing and & Paul Holland engineering. At the time, I was a house assistant engineer & remember being very impressed with the high level of professionalism and ability of the visiting engineer Paul Holland, who I had never met before. I don't believe that he sat down at any time during the session !  -  If my memory serves me right, the recording was completed in one evening session."

Although the band went on to release two studio albums and a multitude of singles, they were unable to recreate the success of "Beach Baby".

Legacy
In the online magazine Freaky Trigger, Robin Carmody wrote that the song marked the end of the original wave of British bubblegum pop, indicating the transition into a period of pastiche "and paying tribute to the American pop of a decade or so before, rather than being gloriously unselfconscious and picking up on what was hot at that moment, always a sign that a genre has reached the end of line." He deemed it a "fantastically-produced slice of Californian fantasypop – orchestra, brass, lavish vocal harmonies, already a tribute song to a vanished era at the time." Further including it in a list of the genre's classics, he described it as "Britgum's dying fall: put the fade on repeat play and hear pop, for the first time, become pure period pastiche.

Chart performance
In 1974, the song peaked at #13 in the UK, #4 in the US, and #1 in Canada.

Weekly singles charts

Year-end charts

Covers
It was subsequently recorded in French by Sacha Distel under the title "Vite, Chérie, Vite".

See also
 List of 1970s one-hit wonders in the United States

References

External links
 

1974 songs
1974 debut singles
British power pop songs
Songs about Los Angeles
Songs about nostalgia
Songs about teenagers
Songs written by John Carter (musician)
RPM Top Singles number-one singles
Tony Burrows songs
UK Records singles
Bubblegum pop songs
Popular songs based on classical music